The Changhua Xizhou Gardens is a garden in Xizhou Township, Changhua County, Taiwan.

Geography
The park covers an area of 123 hectares, making it the largest plain park in Taiwan. The design of the gardens follow the design of Fitzroy Gardens in Melbourne, Victoria, Australia. It consists of park, nursery stock area and forest area.

Events
The park is the venue for the annual Flower Exhibition.

See also
 List of tourist attractions in Taiwan

References

Gardens in Taiwan
Geography of Changhua County
Tourist attractions in Changhua County